The Bulgaria national futsal team represents Bulgaria in international futsal competitions and is controlled by the Bulgarian Football Union and represents the country in international futsal competitions, such as the FIFA Futsal World Cup and the European Championships.

Tournament records

FIFA Futsal World Cup
 1989 - did not compete
 1992 - did not compete
 1996 - did not compete
 2000 - did not compete
 2004 - did not compete
 2008 - did not qualify
 2012 - did not qualify
 2016 - did not qualify
 2020 - did not qualify

UEFA Futsal Championship
 1996 - did not compete
 1999 - did not compete
 2001 - did not compete
 2003 - did not compete
 2005 - did not qualify
 2007 - did not qualify
 2010 - did not qualify
 2012 - did not qualify
 2014 - did not qualify
 2016 - did not qualify
 2018 - did not qualify
 2022 – to be determined

Recent fixtures

Current squad
As of January 2020

See also
 Futsal in Bulgaria
 Bulgaria national football team

References

European national futsal teams
futsal
National